Rush Rush may refer to:

"Rush Rush" (Paula Abdul song), a 1991 song from the album Spellbound
"Rush Rush" (Debbie Harry song), a 1983 song from the Scarface soundtrack

See also
Rush Rush Rally Racing, a 2009 video game